Ice hockey at the 2023 Winter World University Games was held from 11 to 22 January in Lake Placid.

Venues

Medal summary

Medal table

Medalists

Men's tournament

Preliminary round
All times are local (UTC–5).

Group A

Group B

Playoff round

Bracket

Semifinals

Bronze medal game

Gold medal game

Women's tournament

Preliminary round

Playoff round

Bracket

Semifinals

Bronze medal game

Gold medal game

References

External links
Results book

2023 Winter World University Games
2023
2023 Winter World University Games
Winter World University Games